Wang Shufeng (1923–1998) was a People's Republic of China politician. He was born in Luoyang, Henan. He was People's Congress Chairman of Jiangxi. He was a delegate to the 6th National People's Congress and 7th National People's Congress.

1923 births
1998 deaths
People's Republic of China politicians from Henan
Chinese Communist Party politicians from Henan
Delegates to the 6th National People's Congress
Delegates to the 7th National People's Congress